Anna Gunn (born August 11, 1968) is an American actress. She is best known for her role as Skyler White on the AMC drama series Breaking Bad (2008–2013), for which she won the Primetime Emmy Award for Outstanding Supporting Actress in a Drama Series in 2013 and 2014. She has also played Jean Ward in The Practice (1997–2002), and Martha Bullock in Deadwood (2004–2006).

Early life
Gunn was born in Cleveland, Ohio, but grew up in Santa Fe, New Mexico. She is the daughter of Sharon Anna Kathryn "Shana" Gunn (née Peters), an interior designer, and Clemens Earl Gunn Jr., who worked in real estate. She is of Polish, Slovak, English, German and distant Irish and Dutch descent. She graduated from Santa Fe Preparatory School in 1986, then attended Northwestern University, where she majored in theater and graduated in 1990. In the fall of 1988, she spent a semester abroad to study at the British American Drama Academy. She moved to Laurel Canyon, Los Angeles, where she shared a house with Pamela Adlon.

Career
Gunn is known for her role as Skyler White in the AMC drama series Breaking Bad, for which she was nominated for the Primetime Emmy Award for Outstanding Supporting Actress in a Drama Series in 2012, 2013 and 2014, winning in 2013 and 2014. In August 2013, she wrote an op-ed piece for The New York Times examining the public dislike directed toward her character.

Gunn had a recurring role as Assistant District Attorney Jean Ward on the ABC series The Practice from 1997 to 2002, and was series regular Martha Bullock on HBO's Deadwood from 2005 to 2006. She appeared on Seinfeld in the episode "The Glasses", in the Six Feet Under episode "Parallel Play", and on the first season of Murder One.

She provided the voice of Ariel in the Legacy of Kain series of video games, and appeared in the Quantum Leap episode "The Play's the Thing". In 2011, she had a lead role in the Lifetime movie Secrets of Eden, opposite John Stamos. Her other film credits include Without Evidence, Enemy of the State, Treading Water, Twelve Mile Road, and Red State.

In February 2013, cable network Bravo announced that Gunn would star in a pilot for a one-hour TV drama, Rita, based on a Danish TV series about a private-school teacher and mother. The Fox TV Studios pilot was to be written by Krista Vernoff and directed by Miguel Arteta.

In 2014, Gunn starred Off-Broadway with Billy Magnussen in Sex with Strangers, directed by David Schwimmer at Second Stage Theater.

She starred in the 2016 film Equity. Billed as the first female-driven Wall Street movie, it premiered at the 2016 Sundance Film Festival.

In 2019, Gunn starred as Maxine Faulk in the Noël Coward Theater limited-time production of Tennessee Williams' The Night of the Iguana.

Personal life
Gunn married Scottish actor and real estate broker Alastair Duncan in 1990. They divorced in 2009. They have two daughters, Eila Rose and Emma.

Filmography

Film

Television

Video games

References

External links

 

1968 births
20th-century American actresses
21st-century American actresses
Actresses from Santa Fe, New Mexico
American film actresses
American stage actresses
American television actresses
American video game actresses
American voice actresses
Outstanding Performance by a Supporting Actress in a Drama Series Primetime Emmy Award winners
Living people
Northwestern University School of Communication alumni
Alumni of the British American Drama Academy